This is a list of shows that have aired on the Latin American versions of Sony Channel. Shows currently aired on the network are in bold.

0-9
10 Items or Less
3rd Rock from the Sun (repeats currently seen on Comedy Central)
30 Rock (repeats currently seen on TBS)
7th Heaven
8 Simple Rules
90210

A
According to Jim
Águas do Brasil (seen only in Brazil)
The Agency
Agent Carter
Agents of S.H.I.E.L.D.
Agora Sim! (seen only in Brazil)
Alias
Alice
American Dreams
American Idol
American Inventor
America's Got Talent
America's Next Top Model
As If

B
Baby Daddy
Balls of Steel
Beautiful People
Becker 
The Best Years
Bette
Beverly Hills, 90210
Big Day
Black-ish
The Blacklist (seasons 1 and 2 seen on Canal Sony region-wide, currently seen on Canal Sony in Spanish-speaking countries and on AXN in Brazil)
Bloopers
Blow Out
Bob Patterson
Body of Proof
The Boondocks
Brazil's Next Top Model
Breaking Bad (repeats currently seen on AMC)
Breakout Brasil (seen only in Brazil)
Bunheads

C
Los Caballeros las Prefieren Brutas
Call Me Fitz
Carpoolers
Campeões pelo Brasil (seen only in Brazil)
Castle (currently seen on AXN)
Celebrity Apprentice
Celebrity Poker Showdown
Charmed (repeats currently seen on Syfy)
Chefs na Rua (seen only in Brazil)
Cidades do Brasil (seen only in Brazil)
The Client List
Code Black 
Comer Bem Que Mal Tem (seen only in Brazil) 
Commander in Chief
Community (also seen on Comedy Central)
Cougar Town
Coupling (U.S.)
Courting Alex
Covert Affairs
Crumbs
CSI: Crime Scene Investigation (repeats currently seen on AXN and TNT Series)
CSI: Miami (repeats currently seen on AXN and TNT Series)
CSI: NY (repeats currently seen on AXN)
Cuídate de la Cámara (seen only in Mexico)
Cupid
Cursed/The Weber Show
Curtindo o Rio (seen only in Brazil)
Cybill

D
Da Ali G Show
The Daily Show with Jon Stewart: Global Edition
Dawson's Creek 
Days of Our Lives
Dead Like Me
Deadbeat
The Defenders
Desperate Housewives
Devious Maids (currently seen on Lifetime)
The District
Do Over
Drop Dead Diva (currently seen on Lifetime)

E
Eli Stone
Entubados (seen only in Brazil)
The Ellen Show
Emily's Reasons Why Not
Everybody Hates Chris
Everybody Loves Raymond 
ER (repeats currently seen on TNT Series)
EstiloDF (seen only in Mexico)
Extreme Makeover

F
Falcon Beach
Family Law
Felicity
The Fosters
Franklin & Bash
Frasier
Friday Night Lights
Friends (only seasons 1 to 7. It then moved to Warner Channel)

G
The Game
Gary Unmarried
GCB
Ghost Whisperer
Grandfathered
Grey's Anatomy (also aired on Star Channel)
Grosse Pointe
Grounded for Life
Grown Ups

H
Happy Endings
Hidden Hills
Home Improvement
How I Met Your Mother (currently seen on Star Channel)
How to Get Away with Murder

I
In Justice
Iron Chef
The IT Crowd (currently seen on I.Sat)

J
The Jamie Kennedy Experiment
Jane by Design
The Janice Dickinson Modeling Agency
Joan of Arcadia

K
The King of Queens

L
Las Vegas (repeats currently seen on AXN)
Latin American Idol
Law & Order: Criminal Intent (repeats currently seen on AXN)
Less Than Perfect
Life as We Know It
Life with Bonnie
Live from Abbey Road
Love, Inc.

M
Mad About You
The Magicians
Major Crimes
Malibu Country
Man Up!
Married... with Children
Marry Me
The McCarthys (not seen in Brazil)
Medium 
Melissa & Joey
Melrose Place
Melrose Place (2009)
Men, Women & Dogs
Mexico's Next Top Model
Miss Venezuela: Todo Por La Corona
Mistresses (U.S.)
Mixology (not seen in Brazil)
The Muppets 
My Boys
My Wife & Kids

N
Nada Que Ver (not seen in Brazil)
The Nanny 
Nashville
The Neighbors
NewsRadio 
 No Ordinary Family
Norm

O
Off the Map
Olhar Digital Plus [+] (seen only in Brazil and also seen on AXN)
Once and Again
Once Upon a Time
Once Upon a Time in Wonderland

P
Pan Am
Parks and Recreation
Perfect Couples
 Popular
Private Practice

Q
Queer Eye
Queer Eye for the Straight Girl

R
The Real Housewives of Atlanta
The Real Housewives of New York City 
The Real Housewives of Orange County 
Red Band Society (seen only in Brazil)
Revelations
Revenge
Rock Road
Royal Pains
Rosie (1995-2003)

S
Samantha Who?
The Sarah Silverman Program
Saturday Night Live
Scandal
Scorpion (seen on Canal Sony in Brazil and on AXN in Spanish-speaking countries)
Scrubs
Secrets and Lies (seen on Canal Sony in Brazil and on AXN in Spanish-speaking countries)
Seinfeld
Sesiones con Alejandro Franco
Shark Tank
Shark Tank Brasil (seen only in Brazil)
Shasta
Los Simuladores
The $treet
Summerland
Switched at Birth

T
Teen Wolf
That '70s Show
That '80s Show
'Til Death
Time of Your Life
Tommy Lee Goes to College
Top Chef
Life After Top Chef
Top Chef: Just Desserts
Top Chef Masters
Top Design
Trophy Wife
The Trouble with Normal

U
Ugly Betty

V
 The Voice (U.S., currently seen on Universal Reality in Spanish-speaking countries and on E! in Brazil)

W
Wasteland
What About Brian
What About Joan
Whose Line Is It Anyway? (U.S.)
Will & Grace
Wings
Work with Me

X
The X Factor (UK)
The X Factor (U.S.)

Y
Ya Es 1/2 Día en China (not seen in Brazil)
Young Americans
The Young and the Restless
Young & Hungry

Sony Entertainment Television (Latin America)